Priming is the first contact that antigen-specific T helper cell precursors have with an antigen. It is essential to the T helper cells' subsequent interaction with B cells to produce antibodies. Priming of antigen-specific naive lymphocytes occurs when antigen is presented to them in immunogenic form (capable of inducing an immune response). Subsequently, the primed cells will differentiate either into effector cells or into memory cells that can mount stronger and faster response to second and upcoming immune challenges.

Priming of naïve T cells requires dendritic cell antigen presentation. Priming of naive CD8 T cells generates cytotoxic T cells capable of directly killing pathogen-infected cells. CD4 cells develop into a diverse array of effector cell types depending on the nature of the signals they receive during priming. CD4 effector activity can include cytotoxicity, but more frequently it involves the secretion of a set of cytokines that directs the target cell to make a particular response. This activation of naive T cell is controlled by a variety of signals: recognition of antigen in the form of a peptide: MHC complex on the surface of a specialized antigen-presenting cell delivers signal 1; interaction of co-stimulatory molecules on antigen-presenting cells with receptors on T cells delivers signal 2 (one notable example includes a B7 ligand complex on antigen-presenting cells binding to the CD28 receptor on T cells); and cytokines that control differentiation into different types of effector cells deliver signal 3.

Cross-priming 
Cross-priming refers to the stimulation of antigen-specific CD8+ cytotoxic T lymphocytes (CTLs) by dendritic cell presenting an antigen acquired from the outside of the cell. Cross-priming is also called immunogenic cross-presentation. This mechanism is vital for priming of CTLs against viruses and tumours.

Immune priming (invertebrate immunity) 

Immune priming is memory-like phenomenon described in invertebrate taxa of animals. It is evolutionarily advantageous for an organism to develop a better and faster secondary immune response to pathogen, which is harmful and which it is likely to be exposed again. In vertebrates immune memory is based on adaptive immune cells called B and T lymphocytes, which provide an enhanced and faster immune response, when challenged with the same pathogen for a second time. It was assumed that invertebrates do not have memory-like immune functions, because of their lack of adaptive immunity. But in recent years evidence supporting innate memory-like functions were found. In invertebrate immunology the common model organisms are different species of insect. The experiments focusing on immune priming are based on exposing the insect to dead or sublethal dose of bacteria or microbes to elicit the initial innate immune response. Afterwards the researchers compare subsequent infections in primed and non-primed individuals to see if they mount a stronger or modified response.

Mechanism of immune priming 
It seems that the results of immune priming research are showing that the mechanism differs and is dependent on the kind of insect species and microbe used for given experiment. That could be due to host-pathogen coevolution. For every species is convenient to develop a specialised defense against a pathogen (e.g. bacterial strain) that it encounters the most. In arthropod model, the red flour beetle Tribolium castaneum, it has been shown that the route of infection (cuticular, septic or oral) is important for the defence mechanism generation. Innate immunity in insect is based on non-cellular mechanisms, including production of antimicrobial peptides (AMPs), reactive oxygen species (ROS) or activation of prophenol oxidase cascade. Cellular part of insect innate immunity are hemocytes, which can eliminate pathogens by nodulation, encapsulation or phagocytosis. The innate response during immune priming differs based on the experimental setup, but generally it involves enhancement of humoral innate immune mechanisms and increased levels of hemocytes. There are two hypothetical scenarios of immune induction, on which immune priming mechanism could be based. The first mechanism is inducement of long-lasting defences, like circulating immune molecules, by the priming antigens in the host body, which remain until the secondary encounter. Second mechanism describes a drop after the initial priming response, but stronger defence upon secondary challenge. The most probable scenario is the combination of these two mechanisms.

Trans-generational immune priming 
Trans-generational immune priming (TGIP) describes the transfer of parental immunological experience to its progeny, which may help the survival of the offspring when challenged with the same pathogen. Similar mechanism of offspring protection against pathogens has been studied for a very long time in vertebrates, where the transfer of maternal antibodies helps the newborns immune system fight an infection before its immune system can function properly on its own. In the last two decades TGIP in invertebrates was heavily studied. Evidence supporting TGIP were found in all colleopteran, crustacean, hymenopteran, orthopteran and mollusk species, but in some other species the results still remain contradictory. The experimental outcome could be influenced by the procedure used for particular investigation. Some of these parameters include the infection procedure, the sex of the offspring and the parent and the developmental stage.

References

Priming